Ancylodes penicillata is a species of snout moth in the genus Ancylodes described by Alfred Jefferis Turner in 1905. It is found in Australia.

References

Moths described in 1905
Phycitini
Moths of Australia